This is a list of properties and districts in Chatham County, Georgia that are listed on the National Register of Historic Places (NRHP).

Current listings

|}

References

Chatham
Buildings and structures in Chatham County, Georgia